Ali Vyacheslav Polosin is a Russian Muslim academic who converted to Islam in 1999. He is a former priest of the Russian Orthodox Church.

Biography 

He was born in 1956 in Moscow, Russia. Studied Philosophy at Moscow State University. 
 1983-1999 served as priest in Russian Orthodox Church.
 1990-1993 served as Member of Russia's Parliament.

Polosin is an Islamic scholar and an expert on interfaith dialogue and Muslim-Christian relations who is currently Director of Moscow-based Al Wasatiya Center for interfaith dialogue.

Publications 
Books and articles written by Polosin have been translated into many languages.
 Secular State and Islamic Tradition in Russia
 Criminal sectarianism will never become the norm of life

References

External links 
 Islam in Dagestan
 Ali Polosin - My journey to Islam
 Invite to Islam and let your words work (Interview with Ali Polosin)
 Secular State and Islamic Tradition in Russia
 Али Вячеслав Полосин. «Почему я стал мусульманином? (Размышления бывшего священника о религии)». Журнал «Индекс/Досье на цензуру». 11/2000

1956 births
Living people
21st-century Muslim scholars of Islam
Converts to Islam from Eastern Orthodoxy
Russian Sufis
20th-century Islamic religious leaders
Russian religious leaders
Sunni Sufis
Former Russian Orthodox Christians